Meromacrus draco is a species of syrphid flies in the family Syrphidae.

References

Further reading

 Diptera.info
 

Eristalinae
Insects described in 1942
Taxa named by Frank Montgomery Hull
Hoverflies of North America